The 1998 Big 12 men's basketball tournament was the postseason men's basketball tournament for the Big 12 Conference. It was played from March 5 to 8, in Kansas City, Missouri at Kemper Arena. Number 1 seed Kansas defeated 3 seed Oklahoma 72–58 to win the championship and receive the conference’s automatic bid to the 1998 NCAA tournament.

Seeding
The Tournament consisted of a 12 team single-elimination tournament with the top 4 seeds receiving a bye.

Schedule

Bracket

All-Tournament Team
Most Outstanding Player – Paul Pierce, Kansas

See also
1998 Big 12 Conference women's basketball tournament
1998 NCAA Division I men's basketball tournament
1997–98 NCAA Division I men's basketball rankings

References

Big 12 men's basketball tournament
Tournament
Big 12 men's basketball tournament
Big 12 men's basketball tournament
College sports tournaments in Missouri